Ambiente may refer to:

Music
Zoell Farrujia, band member of Panoptica
Ambiente, album by Laserdance 1991
"Ambiente", song by J Balvin from Vibras 2018

See also
Ambient (disambiguation)